Alexandru Onica (born 29 July 1984) is a Moldovan professional footballer who plays as a midfielder for Petrocub Hîncești in the Moldovan National Division.

Club career
Onica began playing football with local side Izvorash Draslicheny at age 12. He joined FC Unisport-Auto Chișinău next before a move to Russia where he played for FC Spartak Chelyabinsk and FC KAMAZ Naberezhnye Chelny. Upon returning from Russia, he joined FC Dacia Chișinău where he would be named the top central midfielder in the 2009 Moldovan National Division by the FMF.

Onica joined Vorskla Poltava on a free transfer in December 2009, signing a three-year contract with the club.

In July 2013 he signed a contract with Lokomotiv Tashkent. On 31 July 2013 he made his debut for Lokomotv in the Uzbek Cup semifinal match against Bunyodkor. In January, he signed for another Uzbekistan club Neftchi Farg'ona FK. Alexandru scored his first goal in Uzbekistan higher division on 22 June against FK Andijan.

International career
Onica has made 22 appearances for the Moldova national team. He played for the under-21 national team before making his senior debut in a friendly against Estonia on 18 November 2008.

References

External links
 
 
 

1984 births
Living people
Moldovan footballers
Moldova international footballers
Moldovan expatriate footballers
FC KAMAZ Naberezhnye Chelny players
FC Dacia Chișinău players
FC Vorskla Poltava players
FC Sheriff Tiraspol players
PFC Lokomotiv Tashkent players
FK Neftchi Farg'ona players
FC Zimbru Chișinău players
CSF Bălți players
FC Milsami Orhei players
Moldovan Super Liga players
Ukrainian Premier League players
Uzbekistan Super League players
Expatriate footballers in Ukraine
Moldovan expatriate sportspeople in Uzbekistan
Expatriate footballers in Uzbekistan
Moldovan expatriate sportspeople in Ukraine
Association football midfielders
CS Petrocub Hîncești players
FC Spartak Nizhny Novgorod players